Evald Hermaküla (6 December 1941 – 16 May 2000) was an Estonian actor and director.

Hermaküla was born in the village of Maardu in Jõelähtme Parish. In 1965 he graduated from the University of Tartu in geology. In 1965 he also finished his studies at Vanemuine Theatre Studio in Tartu. From 1962 he was an actor and from 1969 a stage director in Vanemuine theatre. He also directed and appeared as an actor films and television.

Hermaküla committed suicide by hanging on 16 May 2000 in Kadriorg Park in Tallinn, aged 58. He was buried in Tallinn's Forest Cemetery. At the time of his death, he was married to actress Kaie Mihkelson.

Selected filmography
 1965 Me olime 18-aastased
 1965 Mäeküla piimamees	
 1966 Tütarlaps mustas
 1968 Libahunt	
 1970 Tuulevaikus	
 1985 Puud olid...
 1985 Naerata ometi 
 1986 Saja aasta pärast mais	
 1986 Õnnelind flamingo	
 1987 Ringhoov
 1988 Doktor Stockmann. I part
 1988 Doktor Stockmann. II part
 1989 Regina
 1990 Teenijanna
 1991 Surmatants
 1993 Õnne 13
 1994 Victoria (Ühe armastuse lugu). I part
 1994 Victoria (Ühe armastuse lugu). II part
 1997 Febris

References

1941 births
2000 deaths
People from Jõelähtme Parish
Estonian male film actors
Estonian male stage actors
Estonian male television actors
Estonian theatre directors
Estonian film directors
University of Tartu alumni
Suicides by hanging in Estonia
Burials at Metsakalmistu